June was a weekly British girls' comic published from 18 March 1961 to 15 June 1974 by Fleetway Publications, when it merged into the fellow Fleetway title Tammy (along the way, June absorbed three other titles). June featured a mix of text serials (with spot illustrations) and comic strips.

The problem page was called Angela Replies... (written by Angela Barrie) and the letter column was called Pick of the Post and then later Tell Us about It!. By the early 1970s, the popular fashion doll Sindy appeared in June in Sindy's Scene: Her Diary and Club Page and the strip Sindy and Her Friends, drawn by Phil Townsend.

Publication history 
June launched 18 March 1961. The character of June herself, a blond schoolgirl with a headband, often appeared on the cover, sometimes with her dog Jiffy.

After 174 issues, June absorbed the short-lived title Poppet with the issue of 18 July 1964. The merged title, June and Poppet, published five issues before reverting to June.

After 23 more issues, on 30 January 1965, June merged with School Friend (which had launched in 1950), bringing with it the Bessie Bunter, Lucky's Living Doll, and The Strangest Stories Ever Told (featuring The Storyteller) comic strips. The merged title, June and School Friend, published 355 issues until 13 November 1971, when it reverted to June.

With the issue of 20 January 1973, June merged with Pixie (another short-lived title), becoming June and Pixie. After 74 more issues, it was merged into Tammy on 22 June 1974. The strips Bessie Bunter, Lucky's Living Doll, and Mam'selle X continued in Tammy.

There was also a June and School Friend Picture Library, which published 36 issues in 1965–1966. Absorbing the Princess Picture Library, that title became June and School Friend and Princess Picture Library, publishing an additional 183 issues in the period 1966–1969. Reverting to June and School Friend Picture Library, the title published 32 more issues in the period 1969–1971. (The series began as Schoolgirls' Picture Library in the period 16 July 1957 – 1965 before becoming June and School Friend Picture Library.)

A number of June and School Friend annuals and specials were published in the period 1965–1980.

In 2007, Carlton Publishing Group released The Best of June and School Friend.

Serials and text stories 
 Bijli by Denise Wackrill
 The Mystery of Banshee Towers by Enid Blyton, illustrated by Eric Parker
 The Mystery of the Seal of Babylon by Jean Theydon, illustrated by Jim Baikie
 Pony Trek Penny by Linda Blake, illustrated by Jim Baikie
 The Sea Urchins by Linda Blake, illustrated by Audrey Fawley
 The Shepherd Boy

Strips 

 Angie’s Angel, drawn by Carlos Freixas
 Animal World
 Ann's South Sea Adventure by Jason Alan and Dudley Pout
 Bessie Bunter by Ron Clark and Arthur Martin (1965–1974) — acquired from School Friend; continued in Tammy
 The Black Pearls of Taboo Island
 Boss of Beadle Street
 Call Me Cupid!, drawn by Bill Baker — humorous strip story about a girl who acts as a matchmaker for her picky older sister
 The Champions — profiles of various female competitors
 Cloris and Claire: The Sporting Pair
 Dark Destiny, drawn by A. E. Allen
 Diana's Diary
 Dotty Doogood — humor strip
 Double for Danger, drawn by Leslie Otway
 Emma in the Shade, drawn by Juan Solé
 The Growing-Up of Emma Peel
 Gymnast Jinty, drawn by Jim Baikie — about a popular young gymnast instructor and the dramas of her student Gail. (May have been the inspiration for the later IPC title Jinty.)
 The Grays Fight Back!, drawn by Robert MacGillivray
 Henrietta's Horse
 Jacey, drawn by Giorgio Giorgetti
 Jenny
 Kathy at Marvin Grange School
 Lucky's Living Doll, drawn by Robert MacGillivray — acquired from School Friend
 Mam'selle X (1965–1974), drawn by Giorgio Giorgetti  — actress Avril Claire is not very popular in Occupied France, as she performs for the German troops. But what nobody knows is that she is in fact Mam'selle X, a member of the French Resistance. Acquired from School Friend; continued in Tammy.
 My Brother's a Nut!
 My Dog Cuddles
 My Family, My Foes!, drawn by Carlos Freixas
 Nature’s Wonderful Ways, drawn by Helen Haywood
 Oh, Tinker!, drawn by Trini Tinturé — about a sweet, but confused, little fairy who can cast up to three spells a day
 Olly Goes to School
 Orphans Alone, drawn by Tom Kerr
 Poochy
 School for Sports, drawn by Dudley Wynne
 Secret Agent 13
 The Silver Savage
 Sindy and Her Friends, drawn by Phil Townsend — acquired from School Friend (though drawn by a different artist)
 Slaves of the Sleeping Ones drawn by Juan Solé
 The Spice of Life!
 The Strangest Stories Ever Told (featuring The Storyteller) by various writers and artists (1965–1974) — spooky stories told by a pipe-smoking host; acquired from School Friend; continued in Tammy.
 Swim to Safety!, drawn by Phil Townsend
 Sylvie on a String, drawn by Tony Higham
 Tennis Star Toni, drawn by Giorgio Giorgetti (1961)
 Tilly’s Magic Tranny, drawn by Jim Baikie
 The Twin She Couldn’t Trust!, drawn by Phil Gascoine
 They Call Me a Coward!, drawn by Leslie Otway (1971)
 Vanessa from Venus
 Wild Girl of the Hills, drawn by Carlos Freixas — about a gypsy girl who lives in a cave, making friends with wild creatures

References

Citations

Sources 
 
 
 
 
 
 
 
 
 

1961 comics debuts
1974 comics endings
Children's magazines published in the United Kingdom
British comics titles
British girls' comics
Weekly magazines published in the United Kingdom
Comics anthologies
Defunct British comics
Defunct magazines published in the United Kingdom
Fleetway and IPC Comics titles
Magazines established in 1961
Magazines disestablished in 1974